Masada: Gimel, also known as ג or Masada 3, is a 1995 album by American composer and saxophonist John Zorn released on the Japanese DIW label.   It is the third album of Masada recordings.

Reception
The Allmusic review by Marc Gilman awarded the album 4½ stars stating "At times sounding like an Eastern Ornette Coleman, and sometimes playing with the rampant fury that is characteristic solely of Zorn himself, the band has incorporated and evolved the form of jazz. This album is certainly a highlight of the Masada collection as a whole, and provides a great introduction to the band. Some of the songs can be found reworked on Bar Kokhba as well. There is little more to be said of this album, as the music speaks for itself".

Track listing 
 "Ziphim" - 9:17
 "Abidan" - 6:48
 "Katzatz" - 2:24
 "Hazor" - 6:04
 "Netivot" - 3:38
 "Karaim" - 5:58
 "Hekhal" - 3:02
 "Sheloshim" - 8:15
 "Lebaoth" - 5:12
 "Tannaim" - 8:54
All compositions by John Zorn.
 Recorded at RPM, New York City on February 20, 1994 and at Power Station, New York City on June 22, 1994

Personnel 
Masada
 John Zorn - alto saxophone
 Dave Douglas - trumpet
 Greg Cohen - bass
 Joey Baron - drums

References

1995 albums
Masada (band) albums
albums produced by John Zorn
DIW Records albums